Krzysztof Stefaniak (born 10 December 1957) is a Polish sports shooter. He competed in the mixed 50 metre rifle prone event at the 1980 Summer Olympics.

References

1957 births
Living people
Polish male sport shooters
Olympic shooters of Poland
Shooters at the 1980 Summer Olympics
Sportspeople from Poznań